The H.K. Fritchman House in Boise, Idaho, was a -story Colonial Revival cottage designed by Tourtellotte & Co. and constructed in 1904. The house featured an off center, pedimented porch with Doric columns, decorative window head moldings under side gables, and a prominent, pedimented front gable with dimple window centered below the lateral ridgebeam. The house was added to the National Register of Historic Places (NRHP) in 1982. The house either was demolished or moved after its listing on the NRHP, and further research is needed.

Harry Fritchman was a commercial traveler or traveling salesman based in Boise. He lived briefly in Portland, Oregon, then returned to Boise in 1904, the year the H.K. Fritchman House was constructed. Fritchman served one year as mayor of Boise 1911–1912.

A second H.K. Fritchman House was constructed at 1707 Harrison Boulevard in 1920, and it is a contributing resource in Boise's Harrison Boulevard Historic District. At the time of his death, Harry Fritchman was living two blocks from the second house, at 1606 N. 17th St.

See also
 Fort Street Historic District

References

		
National Register of Historic Places in Boise, Idaho
Houses in Boise, Idaho
Colonial Revival architecture in Idaho
1904 establishments in Idaho
Houses completed in 1904